Kulanada is a village in Pandalam, that is located in the district of Pathanamthitta bordering with Alappuzha district in Kerala state within India. Kulanada assumed its name from the combination of words "Kulam" and "Nada". Kulam meaning pond and Nada meaning the temple where the king of Pandalam worshiped.

The Kulanada village has population of 21217 of which 9777 are males while 11440 are females as per Population Census 2011.
BJP is the current ruling party in Kulanada Panchayath and chithira is the newly elected president of panchayath.
Malayalam is the Local Language spoken here. 

The sub villages in Kulanda are Ambalakkadavu, Punnakulanji, Ulanadu, Ullannur, Kaipuzha, Kaithakadu, Kaluveli, Koodamparampu, Nediyuzhathilpadi, Panangadu, Pookaitha, Manthuka, Parayankara, Vattayam, Pandissery, Panil, Nedumpoyya and Paivazhi

Location
Nearby places are Pandalam, Omalloor and Aranmula. The temple which is famous for Uri Vazhipadu, Ulanadu SreekrishnaSwami Temple is located in Kulanada village. The closest railway station is Chengannur. Airport is Thiruvananthapuram or Cohin .

Renowned Malayalam language novelist Benyamin is a native of Kulanada. Eminent Replacement Surgeon  Dr Binoy Thomas  and Cartoonist Joy Kulanada famous for cartoon series ' Gulf Corner' also belong to Kulanada.

Temples
Kulanada Devi Temple, Pulikkunnil Sree Dharmma Sastha Temple, Gurunathanmukadi Sri Ayyappaguru, Ullannur SreeBhadraDevi Temple, Ulanadu Sree Krishna Swami Temple, Thumpamon sree vadakkunadha temple, Kaipuzha Sree Krishna swami Temple, Thumpinadi Malankaavu Siva Parvathi Temple.

Schools
Panchayath higher Secondary school, Govt. L.P.G School, Shishuvihar ulanadu,  GiriDeepam L.P School, R.R.U.P School, Paivazhi., Govt. U.P School, Manthuka., Y.M.C.A, M.S.L.P School Ulanadu,  st. john's up school ulanadu, prathiksha buds rehabilitation center ulanadu

Churches
St.Thomas Orthodox Church, Manthalir, St.john's orthodox valiya pally ulanadu,  St.Peters Jacobite Syrian Orthodox Chapel, Kulanada,  St. George Orthodox Chapel, Kulanada, St. Thomas Jacobite Syrian Orthodox Cathedral, Manthalir (Manthuka), St.Joseph Malanakara Catholic Church Manthuka, St.Mary's Church, Ullanur, St.Jude's Church (Syrian Catholic), St.John's Marthoma Church, Kaipuzha, The Pentecostal mission church, Kulanada, The India Pentecostal Church of God, Kulanada, Assemblies of God Church, kulanada.

Musical Bands
Freedom Fighters Nasik Dhol, kulanada cofounded by Jeswin & Vimal hiked the name of kulanada. Their team performance on the musical instrument Dhol created a huge impact.

References

 Villages in Pathanamthitta district